Cobleskill Historic District is a national historic district located at Cobleskill in Schoharie County, New York.  The district includes 180 contributing buildings and eight contributing sites.  It encompasses a commercial area, several residential streets, churches, an old school, a railroad, and a fairgrounds.  The area includes a small stream that runs through a park containing a millpond.  The focal point of the community is the 1874 Hotel Augustan, now used for commercial purposes.  The oldest building is the Bull's Head Inn, built in 1802.

It was added to the National Register of Historic Places in 1978.

References

Historic districts on the National Register of Historic Places in New York (state)
Historic districts in Schoharie County, New York
National Register of Historic Places in Schoharie County, New York